Vincenzo Nibali (born 14 November 1984) is an Italian former professional road bicycle racer, who competed as a professional from 2005 to 2022. He is one of seven cyclists who has won all three of cycling's Grand Tours in their career – having won the 2010 Vuelta a España, the 2013 Giro d'Italia, the 2014 Tour de France and the 2016 Giro d'Italia.

Born near the Strait of Messina, his nickname is the "Shark of the Strait", "the Shark of Messina" or simply "The Shark". His first major win came at the 2006 GP Ouest–France, a UCI ProTour event. However, experts such as Michele Bartoli have said Nibali is most suited to competing in multi-stage races. He is a highly capable descender and bike handler, very good climber and good time trialist. Nibali is an all-rounder, and is considered one of the strongest stage race riders of his era, having won Tirreno–Adriatico (2012 and 2013), the Giro del Trentino (2008 and 2013) and the 2016 Tour of Oman.

Nibali is most well known for his Grand Tour performances – finishing on the podium on eleven occasions – but he has proven to be a strong contender in classic cycle races as well, having won the 2014 and 2015 Italian National Road Race Championships, the 2006 GP Ouest–France and three 'Monuments' of road bicycle racing: the Giro di Lombardia in 2015 and 2017, and the 2018 Milan–San Remo. He has also achieved podiums in Liège–Bastogne–Liège and previous editions of the Milan–San Remo.

Early life and career
Vincenzo Nibali was born on 14 November 1984 in Messina, Sicily, the son of Salvatore and Giovanna. In order to become a cyclist, he left his hometown Messina and moved to Tuscany at the age of sixteen. For ten months of the year, he lived in the house of his former directeur sportif, Carlo Franceschi, in Mastromarco, near Lamporecchio. Nibali finished third at the UCI World Junior Time Trial Championships in 2002 and also third at the UCI World Under-23 Time Trial Championships in 2004.

Professional career

Liquigas (2006–12)

2006–08
In that year, he won the French classic GP Ouest–France at 21 years of age. He also finished in second position overall of the 2.1 rated Settimana Internazionale di Coppi e Bartali, taking the win on the first stage. In 2007, Nibali rode the Giro d'Italia for the first time and finished 19th overall. 2008 saw Nibali finish 10th in Liège–Bastogne–Liège, obtaining also an 11th-place finish in the Giro d'Italia and a 20th-place finish in the Tour de France.

2009

2009 saw Nibali record a win in the Giro dell'Appennino where he attacked almost  from the finish to win solo. Another victory in 2009 was the Gran Premio Città di Camaiore. He finished sixth overall in the Tour of California and ninth overall in Tour of the Basque Country, before sharing leadership of Liquigas at the Tour de France with Roman Kreuziger. Nibali proved the stronger of the two and finished in seventh place overall, then his best placing in a grand tour.

2010

Nibali began 2010 in great form by finishing first overall in the Tour de San Luis. He was a last-minute addition to Liquigas' Giro d'Italia squad following Franco Pellizotti's last minute withdrawal over Blood Passport irregularities. Nibali wore the Maglia Rosa after his  team won the stage four team time trial, later won the 14th stage and after some good climbing through the rest of the race, he managed to finish on the podium finishing third behind his teammate Ivan Basso and David Arroyo. In June, Nibali won the Tour of Slovenia. Later in the season, Nibali won the Trofeo Melinda. Nibali won the Vuelta a España without winning a stage, thanks to consistent high placings on summit stage finishes and the race's two time trials. He had inherited the race lead after Igor Antón was forced to abandon after crashing on stage 14. Though he lost it to Joaquim Rodríguez, he later regained it on the final time trial. This marked his first grand tour victory.

2011
Nibali began 2011 with solid form, taking 5th overall in Tirreno–Adriatico. He also enjoyed a solid classics season, recording 8th place in Milan–Sanremo and 8th in Liège–Bastogne–Liège. Nibali was one of the favourites for the Giro d'Italia, with Ivan Basso not riding, giving him sole leadership of Liquigas. Though he entered the race as a big favorite, he could not match Alberto Contador throughout much of the mountains. He still managed to stay in the top three throughout much of the race. He finished third overall behind Alberto Contador and Michele Scarponi, with Nibali and Scarponi fighting over second in the final week when it became apparent the gap to Contador was too large (Contador was later stripped of the title, moving Nibali up to second).

Nibali was also leader of Liquigas at the Vuelta a España. On stage six, Liquigas orchestrated an escape on the descent into Córdoba, but a miscommunication saw Nibali finishing fourth, failing to take any bonus seconds. He moved to third overall on stage 11, behind Sky duo Bradley Wiggins and Chris Froome. Over the Next few stages, Nibali began to chip into the lead of Wiggins by taking time bonuses from sprints. However, stage 14 saw Nibali crack on the final climb, putting him out of contention for a podium placing. He finished seventh overall.

2012
Nibali began the 2012 campaign with second overall in the Tour of Oman, one second behind Peter Velits, winning the queen stage. Nibali finished first overall in the Tirreno–Adriatico after winning stage five. He also won the points classification. In March, Nibali finished third in Milan–Sanremo, his first podium finish in a monument.

He held on to finish in second place.

Nibali chose to focus his attention on the Tour de France, skipping the Giro d'Italia in order to prepare. After a solid first week, Nibali finished fourth on the first summit finish on stage seven to rise to third in the overall standings, sixteen seconds behind leader Wiggins and six behind defending champion Cadel Evans. However, Nibali conceded over two minutes to Wiggins in the time trial on stage nine, where he placed eighth, and slipped to fourth on the GC, behind 's Froome. On stage ten, Nibali attacked on the descent of the Col du Grand Colombier and linked up with teammate Peter Sagan, but the pair were caught by the Team Sky led peloton. Nibali went on the attack again on the following stage, which finished with a climb to La Toussuire, and put time into Wiggins and Froome, only for the pair to drag themselves back to Nibali, although he did move up to third overall after Evans lost time. He attacked again on stage 16 on the Col de Peyresourde with only Wiggins and Froome able to chase. They caught him before the summit; Nibali accelerated again but Wiggins closed the gap and the three of them finished together. Nibali lost time to Wiggins and Froome the following stage, another mountain stage, this time with a summit finish and two stages later in the final individual time trial which Wiggins won. Nibali finished third, the only rider to finish within ten minutes of Wiggins and Froome.

Astana (2013–16)
Nibali left  at the end of the 2012 season, and joined  on a two-year contract from the 2013 season onwards. The deal has been reported to be a €3 million per year contract.

2013
Nibali started his 2013 season in good form finishing 7th in the Tour of Oman and winning Tirreno–Adriatico. In the latter race, he took the leader's jersey off Froome's shoulders in stage 6, where he escaped with Peter Sagan and Joaquim Rodríguez on a short climb with a gradient of 30%. He held off Froome in the final time trial. In April, he won the Giro del Trentino on the final stage featuring a mountaintop finish. He took the lead from Maxime Bouet, who had been the overall leader since the second stage. Nibali powered away on the last Hors Category climb, distancing rivals Mauro Santambrogio and Wiggins, who suffered a mechanical issue, and winning the stage in solo fashion.

Nibali and Wiggins entered the Giro d'Italia as the two favourites for overall victory. Nibali took the leader's pink jersey on stage eight after finishing fourth in the time trial won by Alex Dowsett, conceding only 11 seconds to Wiggins. On stage ten, the first mountain top finish, Nibali finished third behind Rigoberto Urán to extend his lead over second placed Evans to 41 seconds. The rest of the race was severely affected by poor weather conditions. Nibali put further time into his rivals on stage 14, finishing on Monte Jafferau, as he and Mauro Santambrogio rode away in freezing conditions, with Nibali allowing Santambrogio to take the stage win; after the disqualification of Santambrogio, due to a positive test for EPO, the stage victory was retroactively awarded to Nibali. Nibali won stage 18, a mountain time trial, by 58 seconds from Samuel Sánchez, to extend his lead over Evans and Urán to over four minutes. The following stage, scheduled to be the queen stage of the race, had to be cancelled due to snow. Stage 20, the final mountain stage, also saw heavy snow, as Nibali attacked on the final climb to Tre Cime di Lavaredo to win the stage by 17 seconds from Fabio Duarte, with Urán a further two seconds back. Nibali also moved into the lead in the points classification. Nibali safely negotiated the final stage to Brescia to win the Giro by four minutes 43 seconds over Urán, his second Grand tour overall victory. However, as Mark Cavendish collected all the intermediate sprints before winning the final stage, Nibali finished second to Cavendish in the points classification.

At the Vuelta Nibali was vexed as to whether he should chase the red jersey to record his second grand tour in 2013 or reserve his energy for the World Championships to be held just weeks later in his adopted Tuscany. He captured the race lead on stage 4 though losing it on stage 8, he managed to regain it on stage 11, a time trial. He rode well throughout wearing the red jersey for several stages maintaining his race lead through much of the race. Nibali has now worn the leader's jersey more than any other Italian in the history of the Vuelta. He lost his race lead though on stage 19 to Chris Horner. He attacked Horner many times during the final mountain stage on the steep Angliru but he cracked in the end finishing 4th on that stage. He finished 2nd overall in the general classification.

2014

After winning the Giro in 2013, the Tour de France became the main objective for Nibali's 2014 season. Throughout much of his season before the Tour, Nibali showed quiet form before the Tour with no race victories and high finishes. He was also criticized by the Italian press after a disappointing Critérium du Dauphiné. On 28 June Nibali became the 2014 Italian Champion with his first win of the year at the national road race championships, based on the route of the Trofeo Melinda.

Nibali then went on to win the Tour de France. He first secured the leader's yellow jersey on 6 July by winning the  second stage of the Tour, between York and Sheffield, after breaking away right before the finish. On stage 5, a stage featuring nine sectors of pavé, he gained over 2 minutes over a majority of the GC contenders. He continued to lead the race from stage two through eight, losing it to Frenchman Tony Gallopin in the ninth stage. But he regained it in the tenth stage from Mulhouse to La Planche des Belles Filles after one of his biggest general classification competitors Alberto Contador crashed and abandoned the race, and after catching Joaquim Rodríguez and Michał Kwiatkowski up the final climb to Planche des Belles Filles. He won the stage uncontested and re-donned the yellow jersey on Bastille Day in France. Nibali then won stage 13 into Chamrousse after passing Leopold König and Rafał Majka near the top. He would continue to show his dominance through the rest of the Tour and on stage 18 into Hautacam he attacked from the early slopes of the climb and he would win the stage finishing over a minute ahead of second place rider Thibaut Pinot. This gave him his fourth and final stage victory. He finished with an excellent 4th-place finish in the final time trial. He went on to win the general classification by 7 minutes and 52 seconds, the largest margin of victory in the Tour in 17 years. The next race for Nibali was on 16 September at the Coppa Bernocchi. He finished in the lead group (18th) after attacking several times during the event.

2015

In 2015 Nibali made the defense of his 2014 Tour de France title his priority. His first notable result was 16th in the overall classification of Tirreno–Adriatico. He then participated to the Amstel Gold Race and escaped thanks to a late attack, but was reabsorbed by the peloton and finished 65th. In the La Flèche Wallonne, he tried an attack on the penultimate climb, but it failed and he finished 20th, only 19 seconds off the pace. His first significant result of the year was placing tenth in the Tour de Romandie.

In June, he took part to the Critérium du Dauphiné, in which got a second place in the 6th stage and wore the yellow-blue jersey, which was lost the following day; after that, Nibali became the Italian National Champion for the second year in a row. He attacked during the last ascent and got the better of Francesco Reda and Diego Ulissi.

He entered the Tour de France, but lost two and a half minutes to Chris Froome in the first week. He lost a further 4:25 on the first mountain stage to La Pierre-Saint-Martin after he was dropped early in the stage; and was ninth overall after the three Pyrenean stages, trailing Froome by almost eight minutes. As his hopes of a title defense had faded, he attacked in the Alpine stages and won the 19th stage from Saint-Jean-de-Maurienne to La Toussuire-Les Sybelles, after a 62-kilometre solo. At the end of the stage Nibali was accused by Froome of unsportsmanlike behavior for attacking whilst Froome's bicycle had a brief mechanical problem 58 km from the finish. It is not known whether Nibali was aware of the problem, since there was no communication from Radio Tour about the incident (as later stated by Astana manager Alexandre Vinokourov). Television replays showed "Nibali twice glancing over his shoulder before accelerating away." He finished the Tour de France in 4th place overall in the general classification, 8 minutes and 36 seconds down on the winner, Chris Froome. This would be the 10th consecutive grand tour Nibali entered where he finished in the top 10, an achievement unmatched since Miguel Induráin did so in eleven in a row two decades earlier.

On the second stage, however, Nibali was caught up in a large crash and was forced to chase hard to return to the peloton. During the chase he held on to the team car, driven by the team's directeur sportif, Alexander Shefer, and was pulled up towards the main group. Both Nibali and Shefer were disqualified from the race following the stage, with the team also fined. The race director stated that he lamented the rider's "regrettable attitude". He later issued a statement via Facebook where he apologised for his actions.

In the autumn he won the Trittico Lombardo, taking solo victories in the Coppa Bernocchi and Tre Valli Varesine and placing second in the Coppa Ugo Agostoni. In October he won his first Monument, Il Lombardia, attacking on the descent of the Civiglio, the penultimate climb, and arriving solo ahead of Daniel Moreno and Thibaut Pinot.

2016
In February Vincenzo Nibali won the queen stage, finishing on the Green Mountain, and the overall classification at the Tour of Oman.

Preparing for the Giro d'Italia, one of the two main targets of the season, he raced the Italian one-day race Strade Bianche, the stage race Tirreno–Adriatico, where he finished in 6th position overall – conditioned by the cancellation of the queen stage – and Milan–San Remo where he tried an attack on the descent from the Poggio but was caught by the peloton.

He returned to racing in April at the Giro del Trentino, where he demonstrated a bad condition and finished far from the winner Mikel Landa.
The last race before the Giro was Liège–Bastogne–Liège, the most important of the Ardennes classics, concluded more than two minutes behind the winner after being distanced on the Côte de Saint Nicolas.

Nibali entered the Giro d'Italia as the pre-race favourite. On Stage 14, the queen stage of the race, featuring six categorised climbs before the descent to Corvara. His attack distanced the 's Andrey Amador and Alejandro Valverde, who both lost three minutes on the stage. However, Steven Kruijswijk attacked close to the summit, with Esteban Chaves, and the pair dropped Nibali, who lost more than half a minute after the stage. Chaves took the stage honours after outsprinting Kruijswijk, who took the maglia rosa. Stage 15 was the third individual time trial of the race, featuring the ascent to Alpe di Siusi. Kruijswijk extended his lead to more than two minutes over second-placed Chaves as Nibali suffered a mechanical on the climb, losing more than two minutes in the process.

Stage 16 was a short stage which was won by Valverde, who outsprinted Kruijswijk on the line. Kruijswijk extended his lead in the general classification to three minutes as Chaves lost 42 seconds while Nibali cracked on the last climb. He lost almost two minutes to drop to fourth overall, almost five minutes down. Stage 19 was the first to head into the high mountains, featuring the Cima Coppi, the Colle Dell'Agnello, and a subsequent descent and climb to a summit finish at Risoul in France. On the descent of the Colle Dell'Agnello, Kruijswijk crashed whilst trying to follow Nibali. The day proved to be a redemption for Nibali as he won the stage after dropping Chaves on the climb to Risoul. In tears after the finish, the Shark dedicated the win to Rosario Costa, a young cyclist from Nibali's junior cycling team, who had been killed two weeks before. Meanwhile, Kruijswijk crossed the line almost five minutes down on Nibali and more than four minutes behind Chaves. Chaves took the maglia rosa with a 44-second advantage over Nibali as Kruijswijk, who would later be diagnosed with a fractured rib, fell to third overall at a minute and five seconds behind. Stage 20 was the final decisive stage in terms of the general classification, with three first category climbs and the steep third category climb to the finish at Sant'Anna di Vinadio. Nibali attacked on the penultimate climb, distancing Chaves and the other GC contenders, and made up the deficit to Chaves to claim his second Giro d'Italia ahead of the final stage in Turin.

Nibali's other main target of the season was the Olympic Road race. Nibali bridged across to the leading 6 man group on the penultimate descent of the Vista Chinesa circuit with teammate Fabio Aru, and on the final climb of the race he broke clear with Rafał Majka and Sergio Henao. However, Nibali and Henao crashed out of the race on the final descent during the Olympic Road race, with Nibali suffering a broken collarbone.

Bahrain–Merida (2017–19)

2017

After four seasons with Astana, Nibali announced in August 2016 that he would join the newly formed  team in 2017. After two podiums at Giro d'Italia and Vuelta a España, in October he won his second Il Lombardia, by attacking again Thibaut Pinot on the descent of the Civiglio and arriving solo in Como. He finished his season by taking victory in the Taiwan KOM Challenge, setting a new course record in the process.

2018

In March 2018, Nibali won Milan-San Remo, his third cycling monument, becoming the first Italian winner of La Classicissima since Filippo Pozzato in 2006. Nibali had attacked on the Poggio di San Remo, and managed to hold off the sprinters in the closing kilometers to seal victory. Two weeks later, he finished 24th in his maiden Tour of Flanders, which included an attack on the Kruisberg that sparked the winning move of Niki Terpstra. Nibali withdrew from the 2018 Tour de France after stage 12, having suffered a crash on the ascent of the Alpe d'Huez after spectator interference. Although injured with a fractured vertebra, he managed to finish the stage in seventh place, 13 seconds behind stage winner and yellow jersey holder Geraint Thomas.

2019

Nibali entered the Giro d'Italia and finished the race in second place overall, behind Richard Carapaz. Nibali won the shortened Stage 20 of the Tour de France. With  remaining, Nibali attacked and soloed to victory, ten seconds ahead of chasers Mikel Landa and Alejandro Valverde.

Trek–Segafredo (2020–21)
Over his two seasons with the team, he achieved two victories – a final-day stage win that also saw him win the general classification at the 2021 Giro di Sicilia, his home race.

Astana Qazaqstan Team (2022)
After completing the fifth stage of May's Giro d'Italia, which finished in his native Messina, Nibali announced his impending retirement at the end of the season. He cited his desire to spend more time with friends and family. He ultimately finished the race in fourth place overall, his joint-best result of the season, along with the Giro di Sicilia.

In November 2022, it was announced that Nibali would act as a technical advisor for UCI ProTeam , a team that is due to start competing from 2023.

Personal life
Nibali moved to Lugano in the spring of 2012 with his girlfriend Rachele Perinelli. The couple got married in October 2012 and have a daughter, born in February 2014.

Nibali has a younger brother, Antonio Nibali, who is also a racing cyclist, having turned professional in 2014 to ride for the  team in Italy.

Career achievements

Major results
Source: 

2002
 1st  Road race, National Junior Road Championships
 1st  Overall Giro della Lunigiana
 3rd  Time trial, UCI Junior Road World Championships
2004
 UCI Under-23 Road World Championships
3rd  Time trial
5th Road race
 8th Time trial, UEC European Under-23 Road Championships
2005
 6th Milano–Torino
 8th Firenze–Pistoia
2006
 1st GP Ouest–France
 2nd Overall Settimana Internazionale di Coppi e Bartali
1st Stage 1
 3rd Overall Eneco Tour
 4th Gran Premio di Chiasso
 8th Overall Danmark Rundt
 8th Overall Tour de Pologne
 8th Trofeo Melinda
2007
 1st GP Industria & Artigianato di Larciano
 1st Giro di Toscana
 1st Trofeo Città di Borgomanero
 1st Stage 1 (TTT) Giro d'Italia
 2nd Time trial, National Road Championships
 2nd Overall Tour of Slovenia
1st  Points classification
1st Stages 3 & 4
 4th Firenze–Pistoia
 5th Trofeo Sóller
 6th Overall Circuit de la Sarthe
 6th Memorial Marco Pantani
 6th Giro d'Oro
 8th Overall Giro del Trentino
1st  Young rider classification
 8th Gran Premio Industria e Commercio di Prato
2008
 1st  Overall Giro del Trentino
1st Stage 3
 3rd Overall Settimana Internazionale di Coppi e Bartali
 8th Overall Volta a la Comunitat Valenciana
 8th Gran Premio Industria e Commercio di Prato
 10th Liège–Bastogne–Liège
2009
 1st Giro dell'Appennino
 1st Gran Premio Città di Camaiore
 5th GP Miguel Induráin
 5th Klasika Primavera
 5th GP Industria & Artigianato di Larciano
 6th Overall Tour de France
 6th Overall Tour of California
 7th Overall Critérium du Dauphiné Libéré
 9th Overall Tour of the Basque Country
 10th Overall Tirreno–Adriatico
2010
 1st  Overall Vuelta a España
1st  Combination classification
1st Stage 20
 1st  Overall Tour de San Luis
1st Stage 4 (ITT)
 1st  Overall Tour of Slovenia
1st Stage 3
 1st Trofeo Melinda
 3rd Overall Giro d'Italia
1st Stages 4 (TTT) & 14
1st Azzurri d'Italia classification
 3rd Overall Vuelta a Burgos
 5th UCI World Ranking
 5th Giro di Lombardia
 5th Giro dell'Emilia
 8th Overall Tirreno–Adriatico
2011
 2nd Overall Giro d'Italia
1st Stage 16 (ITT)
 5th Overall Tirreno–Adriatico
 7th UCI World Tour
 7th Overall Vuelta a Espana
 8th Liège–Bastogne–Liège
 8th Milan–San Remo
 9th Gran Piemonte
 9th Classica Sarda
 10th Giro dell'Emilia
2012
 1st  Overall Tirreno–Adriatico
1st  Points classification
1st Stage 5
 1st  Overall Monviso-Venezia — Il Padania
1st  Points classification
1st  Mountains classification
1st Stage 4
 2nd Overall Tour of Oman
1st Stage 5
 2nd Liège–Bastogne–Liège
 3rd Overall Tour de France
 3rd Milan–San Remo
 4th UCI World Tour
 4th Overall Tour de San Luis
 5th Road race, National Road Championships
 8th La Flèche Wallonne
 9th Milano–Torino
2013
 1st  Overall Giro d'Italia
1st Stages 14, 18 (ITT) & 20
 1st  Overall Tirreno–Adriatico
 1st  Overall Giro del Trentino
1st  Mountains classification
1st Stage 4
 2nd Overall Vuelta a España
1st Stage 1 (TTT)
Held  after Stages 2, 4–7 & 11–18
 3rd Overall Vuelta a Burgos
 4th Road race, UCI Road World Championships
 5th UCI World Tour
 7th Overall Tour of Oman
 7th Gran Premio della Costa Etruschi
 10th Overall Tour de San Luis
2014
 1st  Road race, National Road Championships (Trofeo Melinda)
 1st  Overall Tour de France
1st Stages 2, 10, 13 & 18
Held  after Stage 13
 5th UCI World Tour
 5th Overall Tour de Romandie
 7th Overall Critérium du Dauphiné
 10th Tour of Almaty
2015
 1st  Road race, National Road Championships
 1st Giro di Lombardia
 1st Coppa Bernocchi
 1st Tre Valli Varesine
 2nd Coppa Ugo Agostoni
 3rd Memorial Marco Pantani
 4th Overall Tour de France
1st Stage 19
 Combativity award Stage 4
 5th Gran Premio Industria e Commercio di Prato
 9th Overall Abu Dhabi Tour
 10th Overall Tour de Romandie
2016
 1st  Overall Giro d'Italia
1st Stage 19
 1st  Overall Tour of Oman
1st Stage 4
 1st Stage 1 (TTT) Giro del Trentino
 4th Overall Abu Dhabi Tour
 6th Overall Tirreno–Adriatico
 Combativity award Stage 7 Tour de France
2017
 1st  Overall Tour of Croatia
 1st Giro di Lombardia
 2nd Overall Vuelta a España
1st Stage 3
Held  after Stage 3
 1st Taiwan KOM Challenge
 2nd Giro dell'Emilia
 3rd Overall Giro d'Italia
1st Stage 16
 3rd Tre Valli Varesine
 4th Overall Giro della Toscana
 5th UCI World Tour
 8th Overall Vuelta a San Juan
 9th Overall Tour de Pologne
2018
 1st Milan–San Remo
 2nd Giro di Lombardia
 8th Giro dell'Emilia
 8th Chrono des Nations
2019
 Tour de France
1st Stage 20
 Combativity award Stage 20
 2nd Overall Giro d'Italia
 3rd Overall Tour of the Alps
 5th Gran Premio di Lugano
 8th Liège–Bastogne–Liège
 8th Milan–San Remo
2020
 3rd La Drôme Classic
 4th Overall Paris–Nice
 5th Gran Trittico Lombardo
 6th Giro di Lombardia
 7th Overall Giro d'Italia
 7th Giro dell'Emilia
2021
 1st  Overall Giro di Sicilia
1st Stage 4
 9th Overall Tirreno–Adriatico
 9th Overall Tour de Luxembourg
 10th GP Industria & Artigianato di Larciano
2022
 4th Overall Giro d'Italia
 4th Overall Giro di Sicilia
 8th Coppa Ugo Agostoni

General classification results timeline

Monuments results timeline

Awards
He won the award in 2010, consecutively between 2012 and 2015, and 2017.

References

External links

 
 

1984 births
Living people
Italian male cyclists
Sportspeople from Messina
Cyclists at the 2008 Summer Olympics
Cyclists at the 2012 Summer Olympics
Cyclists at the 2016 Summer Olympics
Cyclists at the 2020 Summer Olympics
Olympic cyclists of Italy
Giro d'Italia winners
Vuelta a España winners
Tour de France winners
Italian Tour de France stage winners
Italian Vuelta a España stage winners
Italian Giro d'Italia stage winners
2014 Tour de France stage winners
Cyclists from Sicily